Wulkaprodersdorf is a town in the district of Eisenstadt-Umgebung in the Austrian state of Burgenland.

Population

See also 
 Wulka
 Leithaprodersdorf

References 

Cities and towns in Eisenstadt-Umgebung District